Twas the Night Before Christmas is a Christmas television special loosely inspired by the 1823 poem "A Visit from St. Nicholas" by Clement Clarke Moore. It first aired December 7, 1977 on ABC. Directed by Tim Kiley, it stars Paul Lynde, Anne Meara, Martha Raye, and Alice Ghostley.

Plot
The story is set on Christmas Eve in a New England town in the late 1890s. The Cosgrove family's home is in an uproar over the holidays. The patriarch, Clark Cosgrove (Paul Lynde) is frazzled by the gift demands of his loud children. His wife Nellie (Anne Meara) runs into endless friction with Clark's formidable mother (Alice Ghostley), who lives with them.  Nellie's inebriated father (Foster Brooks) and cat-loving mother (Martha Raye) arrive for the holiday, and tensions arise between the mothers-in-law.  A German uncle (Howard Morris) is also arriving, but complications ensue when a traveling salesman (George Gobel) is mistaken for the uncle. Adding to the tumult is a visit from a caroling neighbor (Anson Williams). During the night, Clark's mother-in-law's cat escapes from the house and winds up on the roof.  Clark goes to retrieve the cat and creates a ruckus, waking the house.  When the children ask if the noise came from Santa Claus, Clark initially wants to dispel the myth of Santa Claus. Instead, he appeases them by reciting A Visit from St. Nicholas.

Cast
 Paul Lynde as Clark Cosgrove
 Anne Meara as Nellie, Clark's wife
 Alice Ghostly as Clark's mother
 Foster Brooks as Nellie's father
 Martha Raye as Nellie's mother
 Howard Morris as German uncle
 George Gobel as Traveling salesman
 Anson Williams as Caroling Neighbor

Production
Twas the Night Before Christmas was part of a series of American Broadcasting Company (ABC) television specials starring Paul Lynde to fulfill a contract with him after previous efforts to establish a star vehicle for him, The Paul Lynde Show and The New Temperatures Rising Show, had flopped in the ratings. Whereas previous offerings, most notably the 1976 production of The Paul Lynde Halloween Special, relied on a sketch comedy revue format, Twas the Night Before Christmas retained a narrative format where Lynde and his castmates remained in character for the entire show. Lynde's casting as a relatively straight, dramatic lead fulfilled a longstanding wish of his for more serious roles.

Lynde was responsible for casting Martha Raye as his mother-in-law, telling an interviewer: "It's my chance to repay her for all the times she used me in her NBC Comedy Hour back in the 1950s."

George Gobel's casting in this production was an apparent coincidence and not related to his appearance three years earlier in a holiday special of the same name.

For the climactic recitation of A Visit from St. Nicholas, Lynde was not allowed to rely on cue cards because director Tim Kiley felt they would distract the child actors in the cast. Lynde would later recall: "I had to do the poem five different times for five different camera angles. If America thinks I did this with cue cards, I'll kill myself."

Broadcast
Twas the Night Before Christmas was broadcast by ABC on December 7, 1977. Reviews were not favorable, with The New York Times dismissing its plot as "anemic" and adding its "conceptual hugger-mugger was fatal."  Variety complained that "an inept script and a subpar performance by Paul Lynde worked against the best efforts of a charming cast in this ABC yuletide special." The broadcast ranked 30th for that week's Nielsen ratings. However, it later received an Award of Excellence from the Film Advisory Board.

Twas the Night Before Christmas was never rebroadcast by ABC or any other U.S. television network.  To date, it has not been made commercially available on DVD and, except for a one-time screening at a New York City retro film and television festival in 2001, it has not been seen since its only telecast.

See also
 List of Christmas films

References

External links

Christmas television specials
1977 television specials
American Broadcasting Company television specials
1970s American television specials
Works based on A Visit from St. Nicholas
Television shows based on poems
American Christmas television specials
1970s English-language films